Al-Hajarayn or Hagarein is a village in east-central Yemen. It is located on the Wadi Kasr, in the lower part of the Wadi Duan.

History 
In the 1890s, Theodore Bent and his wife, Mabel Bent, visited Al-Hajarayn. At the time, it was ruled by Sultan Abdul M'Barrek Hamout al Kaiti. Bent stated that although the Sultan was "not entirely under Makalla [Qu'aiti]" despite being under their influence. By 1901, Al-Hajarayn had fallen under Qu'aiti rule alongside the rest of Wadi Duan.

References

External links
Towns and villages in the Hadhramaut Governorate
Photos of al-Hajarayn at the American Center of Research

Populated places in Hadhramaut Governorate